Le Monde illustré (title translation: The Illustrated World) was a leading illustrated news magazine in France which was published from 1857–1940 and again from 1945 to 1956. It was in many ways similar to its contemporary English-language newsmagazine The Illustrated London News and should not be confused with the French newspaper Le Monde.

History and profile
Le Monde illustré was established in 1857. Many of the highly realistic prints published in the medium of wood-engraving were actually made from photographs (through intermediary drawings), at a time when photographic reproduction in print was not technically feasible until the late nineteenth century.  Among its artists were Godefroy Durand and Hector Giacomelli.

Wood-engravings

References

External links

 Issues of Le Monde illustré in Gallica, la bibliothèque numérique de la BnF.
 

1857 establishments in France
1956 disestablishments in France
Defunct magazines published in France
French-language magazines
News magazines published in France
Magazines established in 1857
Magazines disestablished in 1956